Benjamin Byron Davis (born June 21, 1972) is an American actor, writer, director and acting coach.

Career

Davis has appeared primarily on television series, including Without a Trace, Criminal Minds, Gilmore Girls, Windfall, MADtv, Six Feet Under, among other series. In addition to television, he also performs on stage. In 2011, Davis directed the theatre production Awake. Davis voiced and provided performance capture for multiple characters in various Rockstar titles, and is best known for his role as Dutch van der Linde in Red Dead Redemption and Red Dead Redemption 2.

Filmography

Film

Television

Video games

References

External links
 
 

1972 births
American acting coaches
Male actors from Boston
American film directors
American television directors
American male film actors
American male television actors
American male stage actors
American theatre directors
American male voice actors
American male video game actors
Living people